El Capitán State Beach is a protected beach in the state park system of California. The beach is named for José Francisco Ortega, who retired from the Spanish Army in 1795 with the rank of captain and received the Rancho Nuestra Señora del Refugio as a land grant.

Features
El Capitán has a day-use beach as well as a campground with 131 sites (6 of which are RV only) and 5 group sites. There are tide pools on the beach and sycamore and oak trees in the campground area.  Monarch butterflies congregate at El Capitán in autumn to breed.

History
The parkland was acquired between 1953 and 1967 and the State Parks Commission classified El Capitán State Beach in June of 1962. In 2002 the state acquired 2,500 acres at a discount from the owners of El Capitan Ranch. The property rises above the existing park through oak woodlands and chaparral to the ridgelines of the Santa Ynez Mountains. The Refugio oil spill occurred just north of nearby Refugio State Beach in 2015 when a pipeline carrying crude oil ruptured. The spill went into a culvert that ran under US 101 and into the ocean. Both parks were closed for much of the summer during the clean-up, including during the typically busy Memorial Day weekend. The pipeline which caused the disaster is no longer in service.

In 2016, the park's water system was destroyed when the Sherpa Fire swept through a canyon near the main campgrounds. The park had already closed due to the smoke and fire danger. In 2021, a project removed barriers for steelhead trout swimming upstream to reproduce by rebuilding the entrance bridge.

Gallery

See also
List of beaches in California
List of California state parks

References

External links

El Capitán State Beach

1953 establishments in California
Beaches of Southern California
California State Beaches
Campgrounds in California
Parks in Santa Barbara County, California
Protected areas established in 1953
Beaches of Santa Barbara County, California